Mother Earth was an eclectic American blues rock band formed in 1967 in  California, fronted by singer Tracy Nelson.

Nelson, who hailed from Madison, Wisconsin, began her career as a solo artist, but formed the Mother Earth ensemble after moving to San Francisco. The group performed at the Avalon Ballroom and Fillmore Auditorium in the late 1960s, and was included on the soundtrack to the 1968 film Revolution. The group signed to Mercury Records, recording four albums. Mike Bloomfield played guitar on their 1968 release Living with the Animals, and Boz Scaggs was a member of the group on their 1969 release Make A Joyful Noise.  In addition to blues, the early incarnation of the group displayed influences from gospel, R&B, jazz, country and even a touch of psychedelia. After the first album, Mother Earth moved their base of operations from the Bay Area to a farm outside of Nashville, Tennessee. The nucleus of the band solidified around Nelson, keyboardist Andy McMahon and guitarist John "Toad" Andrews. Their manager and producer was Travis Rivers. Nelson was an astute judge of up-and-coming songwriters and was an early supporter of then largely unknown names like John Hiatt, Steve Young, and Eric Kaz.  Mother Earth's version of Young's "Seven Bridges Road" predates the Eagles' cover by about nine years. After two LPs with Reprise Records and one with Columbia Records the ensemble continued to tour as Nelson's backup band but did not record anymore. They finally called it quits in early 1977. Tracy Nelson meanwhile returned to recording as a solo artist in 1974, issuing LPs on Atlantic Records, MCA Records, Adelphi Records, Flying Fish Records, and others.

Members
1967: Tracy Nelson, Powell St. John, George Rains, Wayne Talbert, Ira Kamin, Jance Garfat.

1968: Tracy Nelson, Powell St. John, John Andrews, Bob Arthur, George Rains, Luis Gasca, Mark Naftalin.

1969: Tracy Nelson, Powell St.John, John Andrews, Bob Arthur, Boz Scaggs, Lonnie Castille.

1970: Tracy Nelson, John Andrews, Andy McMahon, Bob Cardwell, David Zettner, Karl Himmel, James Day.

1971: Tracy Nelson, John Andrews, Andy McMahon, Bob Cardwell, Karl Himmel, Tim Drummond.

 Tracy Nelson
 Powell St. John
 Wayne Talbert (early member prior to first album)
 Ira Kamin (early member prior to first album)
 John Andrews
 Bob Arthur
 Mark Naftalin
 George Rains
 Boz Scaggs
 Ronald Stallings
 Lonnie Castille
 Clayborne Cotton
 Johnny Gimble (not actually a member, but a frequent contributor on albums)
 Bob Cardwell
 Karl Himmel
 Andrew McMahon
 David Zettner
 James Clayton Day (Jimmie Day)
 Tim Drummond
 Jack Lee
 Steve Mendell
 Jerry Carrigan
 Beau Dollar
 Luis Gasca

Discography
Living with the Animals (Mercury Records, 1968) U.S. No. 144
Mother Earth Presents Tracy Nelson Country (Mercury Records, 1969) - Tracy Nelson's solo album, recorded with the participation of some members of the band.
Make A Joyful Noise (Mercury Records, 1969) U.S. No. 95
Satisfied (Mercury Records, 1970)
Bring Me Home (Reprise Records, 1971) U.S. No. 199
Tracy Nelson/Mother Earth (Reprise Records, 1972) U.S. No. 205
Poor Man's Paradise (Columbia Records, 1973) U.S. No. 210

References

1967 establishments in California
1977 disestablishments in California
American blues rock musical groups
Musical groups from San Francisco
Musical groups established in 1967
Musical groups disestablished in 1977